Parisam Pottachu is a 1987 Indian Tamil-language film directed by K. Shozharajan and written by Es. N. Ravi, starring Pandiyan, Madhuri and Ranjini. It was released on 18 September 1987.

Plot 

A girl becomes insane after her lover drowned. Ramu, the son-in-law of the village VIP, has a soft corner for her. When he tries to find who is responsible for her pregnancy, she is shocked. Since Ramu's wife is barren, the insane girl becomes a surrogate mother, but later drowns in the sea.

Cast 
Pandiyan as Ramu
Madhuri
Ranjini as the insane girl
Malaysia Vasudevan as the village VIP
Karthik as Murali (guest appearance)
S. S. Chandran
Senthil
Kumarimuthu

Soundtrack 
The music was composed by Manoj–Gyan.

Reception 
The Indian Express wrote, "The story is utterly contrived. Songs, cabaret numbers and fights regularly dot the screenplay."

References

External links 
 

1980s Tamil-language films
1987 films
Films scored by Manoj–Gyan